Johnson Park  may refer to:
 Johnson Park in Victoria, Australia
 Johnson Park, Yeovil,  Somerset, England
 Johnson Park, California, a census-designated place
 Johnson Park (New Jersey), Piscataway
 Johnson Park in La Belle, Missouri

See also
 Cooper Library in Johnson Park, Camden, New Jersey